Irit Linur (born 1961) is an Israeli author.

Biography
Irit Linur was married to Alon Ben David, Senior Defense Correspondent for Israel Channel 10 and Middle East Correspondent for Jane's Defence Weekly.

Literary career
Linur started her writing career as a satirical columnist in local newspapers. Her first full-length novel was The Siren's Song, a best-selling romantic comedy set on the background of the Scud missile attacks on Tel Aviv during the Gulf War in 1991. In 1994, the book was adapted into a feature-length film directed by Eytan Fox. The  title refers to the air-raid sirens which sounded almost every night during the six weeks of the war. It is the story of an assertive professional woman who experiences emotional growth and romance. At the same time, the book is critical of Tel Aviv's superficial lifestyle.

Linur's second novel, Two Snow Whites, is about a photographer who finds herself involved in a murder case. Sandler Ella, her third novel, depicts the glamorous life of media broadcasters. Her fourth novel, The Brown Girls, was adapted as a popular television mini-series. Linur has also published a book of humorous essays, The Secret Blonde.

Linur is a co-host on the radio show "The Final Word" on Galei Zahal, Israel's Military Radio. The show would initially pair a liberal and a conservative who'd discuss current events, with Linur playing the liberal part. However, in recent years she has expressed views hostile to liberal groups, left-wing politicians and minorities in Israel. In 2002, Linur called for a boycott of Haaretz newspaper until it fires left-wing journalists Amira Hass and Gideon Levy.

In April 2019, Linur apologized on the air after she and her co-host insinuated that a journalist's wife, a public attorney,  was the source behind his news reports concerning PM Netanyahu's investigations.

In May 2019, referring to a protest, which featured both Jewish and Muslim speakers, including Israeli Arab politician, MK Ayman Odeh, Linur commented on the air that the protest would have been better off, had Odeh been replaced by two gas station workers as the representatives of the Israeli Arab public.

References

External links 

 IMDB entry for Song of the Siren
 Interview with Irit Linur about her television series "Unprejudiced", based on Jane Austen's Pride and Prejudice

1961 births
Living people
People from Tel Aviv
Israeli women novelists
Israeli novelists
Tel Aviv University alumni
Israeli women journalists
Haaretz people
Israeli radio presenters
Israeli women radio presenters
Israeli satirists
Women satirists
Israeli columnists
Israeli women columnists